The 2023 Firestone Grand Prix of St. Petersburg was the first round of the 2023 IndyCar season. The race was held on March 5, 2023, in St. Petersburg, Florida on the Streets of St. Petersburg. The race consisted of 100 laps and was won by Marcus Ericsson.

Entry list

Practice

Practice 1

Practice 2

Qualifying

Qualifying classification 

 Notes
 Bold text indicates fastest time set in session.

Warmup

Race 
The race started at 12:30 PM ET on March 5, 2023. Romain Grosjean took pole position, the second pole of his IndyCar career, ahead of Andretti teammate Colton Herta. Grosjean led away from the start however the race was red flagged due to an incident involving Devlin DeFrancesco, who was launched into the air following contact with rookie Benjamin Pedersen. Grosjean would lead 31 laps, but retired on lap 71 following an incident with defending St. Petersburg race winner Scott McLaughlin. McLaughlin, who had just exited the pits in the lead of the race, attempted to defend against the charging Grosjean into turn 4, locking his cold rear tires. As a result, McLaughlin missed the apex of the corner and collided into Grosjean, sending them both into the barrier and ending Grosjean's race.  Arrow McLaren's Pato O'Ward would take over the lead of the race, however his engine briefly shut off exiting turn 14 due to a 'plenum backfire' allowing Chip Ganassi Racing's Marcus Ericsson through into the lead. Ericsson would hold onto the lead to take his 4th IndyCar victory, and his first since the 106th Running of the Indianapolis 500. O'Ward would finish 2nd, with Ericsson's teammate Scott Dixon finishing 3rd, ahead of Alexander Rossi and Callum Ilott, the latter scoring his career best IndyCar finish. Ganassi's Marcus Armstrong was the highest-finishing rookie in 11th, just ahead of Argentine newcomer Agustín Canapino for Juncos Hollinger Racing.

Race classification

Championship standings after the race 

Drivers' Championship standings

Engine manufacturer standings

 Note: Only the top five positions are included.

References

Grand Prix of St. Petersburg
Firestone Grand Prix of St. Petersburg
Firestone Grand Prix of St. Petersburg
Firestone Grand Prix of St. Petersburg
Firestone Grand Prix of St. Petersburg